Jaadar is a town in Nador Province, Oriental, Morocco. According to the 2004 census, it has a population of 9,497.

References

External links 
 Jaadar sur le site de World Gazetter, par Stefan Helders 

Populated places in Nador Province